Tonge is a surname. Notable people with the surname include:

Dale Tonge, English footballer
Gavin Tonge, West-Indian cricketer
Israel Tonge, English divine
Jenny Tonge, British politician
Michael Tonge, English footballer
Roger Tonge, British actor

See also

Tonie, name
Tonye

Surnames of English origin